Mike Houston is an American actor known for his roles in Boardwalk Empire, Flesh and Bone, Orange Is the New Black, and She Said where he plays the voice of Harvey Weinstein.

Filmography

Film

Television

Video games

References

External links
 

Living people
American male film actors
American male television actors
Year of birth missing (living people)
Place of birth missing (living people)